Alphabeat were a Danish pop band from Silkeborg, fronted by singers Stine Bramsen and Anders Stig Gehrt Nielsen. Their single "Fascination" was a major hit in Denmark during the summer of 2007, as well as the United Kingdom in 2008. Follow-up single "10.000 Nights of Thunder" (or just "10,000 Nights" in the UK) saw success and their eponymous debut album reached number two in Denmark and number ten in the UK. It has sold over 100,000 copies and their three top twenty singles have sold altogether in the region of 400,000.

History

2003–2007: Formation and early career

Alphabeat is made up of six members: Anders Stig Gehrt "Anders SG" Nielsen, Stine Bramsen, Anders "Anders B" Bønløkke, Rasmus Nagel, Anders Reinholdt and Troels Møller.

The group first formed in 2003 under the name Sodastar, in the Danish town of Silkeborg.  As Sodastar, they won the 2004 edition of Danish music contest LiveContest DK, which enabled the creation of a self-titled EP and 16-date promotional tour.

The band's early sound was described as "the point at which "too corny" becomes the embodiment of cool", with influences from the likes of "Chic, Wham!, The Pointer Sisters, The B-52’s and Let's Dance-era Bowie."

In 2006, the group changed their name to Alphabeat, to avoid confusion with a German band.

2007–2009: Alphabeat 
The band's eponymous debut album, Alphabeat, was released in Denmark on 5 March 2007, peaking at number two on the Danish Albums Chart and reaching platinum status in five months of release. The band's success in their domestic market attracted the attention of several major labels from larger markets abroad and Alphabeat was eventually signed to EMI's Charisma Records label in the United Kingdom. Their debut UK single, "Fantastic 6", was released on 26 November 2007, followed by the international release of Alphabeat, retitled This Is Alphabeat, the following year. It peaked at number ten on the UK Albums Chart and was certified gold by the British Phonographic Industry on 10 October 2008. In 2009 Alphabeat won an EBBA Award. Every year the European Border Breakers Awards (EBBA) recognize the success of ten emerging artists or groups who reached audiences outside their own countries with their first internationally released album in the past year.

Alphabeat received several positive reviews in major British publications such as the NME, The Observer, Digital Spy and Popjustice. On 20 December 2008, it was announced via press release that the band had been dropped by their UK label Charisma Records. In a statement from the band on 19 January 2009, it was confirmed that they had chosen to leave the label after being given the opportunity.

2009–2013: The Spell and Express Non-Stop 
It was announced on 7 March 2009 that Alphabeat had signed a new record deal with Polydor Records. The band's manager said, "We are thrilled to be signing to one of the UK's most successful record companies, and looking forward to achieving even more success with the band and Polydor in the coming years."

In August 2009, Popjustice premiered their single "The Spell" which was set for an October release, with their second album released shortly thereafter. The album was released as The Spell in Denmark on 26 October 2009, where it charted at number five and was certified gold in less than two months of release. Originally set for release on 2 November 2009, the UK release was subsequently pushed back until 1 March 2010 and the album's title was changed to The Beat Is... It debuted and peaked at number thirty-nine on the UK Albums Chart.

On 9 January 2010 "DJ" was released as the second single in the Danish market, with a UK release, under the title "DJ (I Could Be Dancing)", scheduled for 31 May. The second UK single, "Hole in My Heart", was released on 22 February 2010, debuting at number twenty-nine on the UK Singles Chart.

Alphabeat's third studio album, Express Non-Stop, was released on 24 September 2012. The album's first single, "Vacation", was released as a digital download in the UK on 12 March 2012. A second single, "Love Sea", was released on iTunes on 13 August 2012. Two more singles, "X-Mas (Let's Do It Again)" and "Show Me What Love Is" were released from the album before the band went on hiatus to focus on side projects in 2013.

2013–2019: Hiatus and solo projects

On 18 September 2013, after a series of gigs supporting Express Non-Stop, Alphabeat posted that they were "over and out" on their social media feeds, suggesting the band were taking hiatus.

On 23 September, it was confirmed that lead vocalist Stine Bramsen had signed a recording contract to produce her own solo album. The album, Fiftyseven, was released on 9 October 2015 and reached number 1 on the Danish charts. It was proceeded in 2015 by a self-titled EP and succeeded in 2018 by a second EP, Bruised.

In July 2014, vocalist Anders SG and guitarist Anders Bønløkke formed production duo THANKS, releasing the single "Comeback Girl." The duo returned in 2016 with new track "Dizzy" and continued to release music until 2018, with the release of the album Mind Expansion.

On 1 June 2018, Alphabeat released a 10th Anniversary edition of This is Alphabeat exclusively on vinyl. The record featured an adjusted tracklisting, using the original Danish recording of "Nothing But My Baby" and including "Into the Jungle" and "Ocean Blue", both also from the album's original release.

2019–2021: Don't Know What's Cool Anymore and second split
Following a six-year hiatus, Alphabeat signed a new recording deal with Atlantic Records and released a new song, "Shadows", the lead single for the fall release of their fourth studio album. The band also announced a series of performance events in the United States, led by a Neon Gold Records showcase at the SXSW event on 13 March 2019, as well as a tour of their native Denmark, as part of Grøn Koncert during July 2019.

On 30 August 2019 Alphabeat released the second single from their fourth album, "I Don't Know What's Cool Anymore". Alongside this, the band formally announced the album itself, titled Don't Know What's Cool Anymore, with a release date of 1 November 2019.

On 3 September 2019 the band announced a 10-date tour of Denmark throughout February 2020. A week later, on September 10, they announced an additional three dates in the United Kingdom, scheduled for April 2020. Alongside this, the group also released a UK radio edit of previous single "Shadows".

On 23 September 2019, "Shadows" was nominated for 'Radio Hit of the Year' at the 2019 Danish Music Awards. A day later, the music video for "I Don't Know What's Cool Anymore" was released, directed by band members Rasmus Nagel and Anders Reinholdt.

On 16 November 2019, the band released a third music video, for the album track "Sing a Song". The following day, Danish television channel DR3 premiered a documentary series focusing on Alpahabeat. Titled Alphabeat - Da Festen Forsvandt (English: Alphabeat - When the Party Disappeared), the 4-part series explores the group's relationships and troubles surrounding the release of their 2012 album and 2013 hiatus.

On 15 May 2020 it was announced that "Shadows" had been nominated for a second award, the "Most Played Song of the Year" at the Carl Prisen Awards.

On 26 June 2020, Alphabeat released a new single; titled "Sometimes 2020", it is a reworking of their 2019 song "Sometimes".

On 1 June 2021, almost a year after their previous release, the group announced they had been chosen to produce the official Danish song for the postponed 2020 UEFA Championship. The track, "Danmarks Dynamite", marks the band's first release in Danish and is a collaboration with members of the Denmark national football team. It was released three days later, on June 4, with an accompanying music video premiering on June 9.

On September 24, 2021, the group played Fredagsrock, the Friday-night concert event at Copenhagen amusement park Tivoli. A day later, the group confirmed via social media that this was "the final outdoor Alphabeat show ever".

On 16 October they played their last gig, part of a 9-date tour of Denmark previously billed as their "last tour... for now."

On 9 December 2021, the band shared a behind-the-scenes video of their final show to their Facebook account. Alongside this, they shared the reasoning behind their second split, explaining that whilst they had "no plans on writing new songs or to go on tour again," they wouldn't rule out a future return, teasing "What's gonna happen in the future? Well, does anyone really know these days..."

Following these shows, lead singer Stine Bramsen returned to her solo work, starting with the comeback single "What I Want You To Do" on September 24, 2021.

A year later, in September 2022, Anders SG also began a solo career, releasing the debut single 'Noget For Nogen.'

Touring
Alphabeat made their UK debut at Monto Water Rats in May 2007 and later that year embarked on their first UK tour (The Wolfbaggin' tour), supporting Lil Chris and Daniel Powter. They were offered the chance to open for the Spice Girls during their 2007–08 Return of the Spice Girls tour, but declined the opportunity, feeling that it would be "too weird" to suddenly play in front of a 23,000 audience unfamiliar with the band's music.

They have often been associated with the wonky pop movement—their manager owns the brand name—and they have played a number of Wonky Pop events and tours.

During the summer of 2008 they played numerous British and international festivals including T in the Park on "Camper's Friday", Roskilde Festival, T4 on the Beach, Summerfestival (in Klaksvík, Faroe Islands, in early August), and in October 2008, along with many other bands at the National Exhibition Centre in Birmingham, England for hundreds of young girlguides.

During late 2008, Alphabeat began a twenty-two-gig tour in the UK and the Netherlands, with many shows sold out. In the same year, the band was planning to play select shows with American singer Katy Perry on her 2008 world tour. However, in March 2009, Alphabeat cancelled their appearances in support of her US tour. Their management stated that they were instead working on their second album and planned to tour the US later in the year.

They performed a mini UK tour to promote The Spell in autumn 2009 and toured the UK throughout April 2010, on The Beat Is... Tour. They also played a support slot for Lady Gaga on the UK and Irish leg of her The Monster Ball Tour, which took place in February and March 2010. They made their US debut at the 2010 SXSW Festival. In June 2010, they co-headlined with Wheatus at Trinity May Ball, in Cambridge, UK.

On 26 July 2011, Alphabeat were the midline act at the pre-event party for the UK contingent of 4000 scouts, the night before leaving for the 22nd World Scout Jamboree in Sweden. The year after, on 28 July 2012, Alphabeat performed as the closing act for Jamboree Denmark 2012.

Members
Stine Bramsen – vocals
Anders Stig Gehrt "Anders SG" Nielsen – vocals, percussion, acoustic guitar
Anders "Anders B" Bønløkke – guitar, keyboards, backing vocals
Anders Reinholdt – bass, keyboards, backing vocals
Rasmus Nagel – keyboards, backing vocals
Troels Møller – drums, backing vocals

Discography

 Alphabeat (2007)
 The Spell (2009)
 Express Non-Stop (2012)
 Don't Know What's Cool Anymore (2019)

Solo projects

Stine Bramsen
In 2011, Bramsen's vocals were featured in the dance hit "I Want You (To Want Me Back)", by Danish duo Morten Hampenberg & Alexander Brown. The single was certified gold in Sweden. This was followed in 2013, with her vocals featuring in "32", a popular release by Danish rock band Carpark North.

Following Alphabeat's hiatus in 2013, Bramsen pursued a solo career and began releasing music under her own name. In January 2014, she released her first single, "Prototypical", which appeared at number 2 on the Hitlisten Danish Singles Chart in its first week of release. This was followed by "Move Forward", on 30 May 2014, and "The Day You Leave Me", which was released 31 October 2014. A fourth single, "Karma Town", followed on 9 February 2015, which charted at number 30.

A self-titled EP was then released on 27 March 2015, consisting of Bramen's previous singles, alongside two new tracks. This peaked at number 11 on the Danish Albums Chart. Bramsen then went on to release one more single, "Woman", on 5 September 2015, before releasing her debut solo album, "Fiftyseven", on 9 October 2015. The album peaked at number 1 in Denmark.

Bramsen's next release was the song "Keep Dreaming", in collaboration with Danish DJ Hedegaard, released 9 September 2016. This was followed by three solo singles, "L.A.C.K." on 13 October 2017, "You're Not Giving Up" on 15 March 2018 and "Can't Get Over You" on 4 May 2018. These three songs became part of Bramsen's second EP, "Bruised", released 1 June 2018.

A follow-up single, "Can't Let It Go" featuring Danish soul and R&B singer Patrick Dorgan, was released in October 2018.

On 11 October 2020, Bramsen featured on the Danish reality series Toppen af Poppen. A single, "Backwards" featuring Søren Huss, was released to compliment her appearance.

In June 2021, Bramsen featured on the Volbeat track "Dagen Før". Released June 2, this marked Bramen's first commercially released song performed in Danish, pre-dating "Danmarks Dynamite" by two days.

Following Alphabeat's second split, Bramsen returned to her solo work, releasing the single "What I Want You To Do" on September 24, 2021. This was followed on March 4, 2022, with "Mother Earth" and, most recently, "Sex it Away" on August 12, 2022.

In June 2022, Bramsen also featured on the official Danish song for the UEFA Women's Euro 2022, accompanied by members of the Denmark women's national football team and produced by Lidt Til Lægterne.

As of August 2022, Bramsen is featuring in the DR television series Min Sang til Danmark, a programme in which Danish musicians are challenged to write a song celebrating the country. To accompany her appearance, the promotional single "Det Er Mit Land" was released on August 19.

Discography / albums and EPs

Discography / singles

Discography / featured in

Thanks
In July 2014, lead singer Anders SG, and guitarist Anders B, formed a solo project called Thanks. They have described their sound as "Motown meets EDM anno 2014. The Jets produced by Calvin Harris and Rostam Batmanglij with Phil Spector on the line". On 24 July, the duo released a music video for their first single "Comeback Girl".

Two years later, on 14 April 2016, the duo returned with new track "Dizzy". This was followed on 19 August 2016 with "Livin' My Life", a remix of Jill Scott's "Golden", and on 9 December 2016 with "Your Man", a track featuring the vocals of Australian singer Sam Sparro. Three more singles followed, "I Can Get" featuring Go Go Berlin singer Christian Vium on 23 June 2017, "Sunshine" on 30 January 2018 and "Mind Expansion" on 13 February 2018.

The duo then released their latest single, "Good Thing" on 1 March 2018, before releasing their debut album, named after previous single "Mind Expansion", on 16 March. An EP of remixes by Ted Jasper, Blüsh and Aaron Brockovich was released 29 June 2018.

The pair have also contributed remixes of the Andrew McMahon in the Wilderness song "So Close", in 2017, and the Weezer song "Happy Hour", in 2018.

In January 2021, it was reported that SG and Bønløkke had composed a new version of the theme tune to Lykkehjulet, the Danish version of game show Wheel of Fortune.

In September 2022, the pair were credited as composers of an advert for TV 2 Play, the video on demand service of Danish TV network TV 2. The clip, titled "The Sound of TV 2 PLAY", features singer-songwriter Saveus.

Discography / albums & EPs

Discography / singles

Discography / featured in

Anders SG

In June 2022, Anders SG featured with Danish musician  on the single "I'm Only Alone Without You." Realsed under the name 'Frankie & Me,' SG later revealed via Instagram that the song was first written "11 years ago".

In August 2022, SG again took to Instagram, posting that he had "been making a lot of music," suggesting he was to release further tracks. On September 19 this was confirmed, with the announcement of a debut single, album and tour.

SG's first single, "Noget For Nogen" was subsequently released on September 23. A day later, on September 24, SG appeared on Danish radio station DR P4 to promote the single.

Discography / singles

References

External links
 
 Alphabeat interview 2008 on ilikemusic.com
 STV interview with Alphabeat singer Stine Bramsen
 Monster UK Tour with Alphabeat and Semi Precious Weapons

Danish dance music groups
Danish pop music groups
Danish Eurodance groups
Europop groups
Dance-pop groups
Power pop groups
Wonky pop musical groups
Atlantic Records artists
Fascination Records artists
Interscope Records artists
Polydor Records artists
Warner Music Group artists
Musical groups established in 2003
English-language singers from Denmark